Buddy's Adventures is a 1934 Warner Bros. Looney Tunes cartoon, directed by Ben Hardaway. The short was released on November 17, 1934, and stars Buddy, the second star of the series.

Summary
Buddy and Cookie float through a terrible thunderstorm in a hot air balloon of Buddy's design. "In a few minutes, we'll be on Mars", promises Buddy. Cookie is afraid; when a bolt of lightning streaks by, Buddy nonchalantly dismisses it as probable flatulence on his part. But the next bolt sends Cookie into Buddy's arms, and both are sorely afraid. The balloon knocks into a storm cloud that resembles a human face: the cloud blows the delicate vessel into another, which instead of winds lends blows, like those of a boxer, to the balloon. The couple spins round and round until they encounter a cloud resembling a rattlesnake which spits such lightning that two of the balloon's tethers split; another bolt severs the basket entirely & the two fall, in a winding path, to the earth. The basket glides along, the balloon's anchor trailing behind, and Buddy and Cookie pass a signpost pointing in the direction whither they are headed: "To Lemonia, the Sour Domain." A large bird, thinking it has dodged the oncoming cart, is caught by the trailing anchor and let off on a log. A gate opens at the sight of the basket, which continues to roll until it is dismantled by a crash.

"Well, here we are!" Buddy announces, happily enough. "Alright, smarty, where are we?" replies Cookie. Both look up at the structure into which the basket crashed: "This is Sourtown." And the sign continues to enumerate the rules of the domain: laughing, singing, dancing, and jazz music are expressly forbidden; but Buddy can not but be tickled by the absurdity of this, and laughs heartily at the very thought. He stops only when Cookie points out to him caricatures of Laurel and Hardy in the stocks for smiling and laughing, along with a tiny bird (another Laurel) similarly imprisoned for singing. Quietly, Buddy and Cookie spy three men, the smallest of them carrying a mandolin, drinking from a butt of vinegar and rhyming about their grim outlook on life, at "Ye Pessimist's Club". Optimist Buddy seeks no further restraint, and gladly intervenes on the meeting; picking up the mandolin, he plays and sings "Hey, Sailor!" as Cookie dances. Birds and flowers join in the song. A policeman hears the merriment, and sets off to catch the perpetrators; on hearing his approach, the three grouches sneak away, and Our Hero and his sweetheart are apprehended.

Sourpan, king of Sourland, juices lemons with the crown atop his head, pours the liquid into a bowl, and drinks of it, further souring his countenance. The officer brings Buddy and Cookie before the crabby monarch, who sentences the guilty two to the punishment of spanking: for that purpose, a hand-cranked machine is freshly oiled. Duly scared, Cookie whispers to Buddy, "What'll we do?" "Leave it to me!" he responds. With that, Our Hero begins a rousing harmonica solo, to the terror of the king. Cookie dances, candles melt, the king's retinue begin to sway with the tune. Finally captivated, the king announces his pleasure with Buddy's music. The court sings; the king merrily dances on a rug, but loses his balance and falls into the spanking machine, chortling lustily as one of his men spanks him continually. Buddy, in triumph, sits, crowned, upon the king's throne; Cookie, beside him, now wears Buddy's hat; the two embrace.

References

External links

1934 films
1934 animated films
1930s American animated films
1930s animated short films
American black-and-white films
Animated films about aviation
American dystopian films
Films scored by Bernard B. Brown
Films scored by Norman Spencer (composer)
Films about freedom of expression
Films directed by Ben Hardaway
Buddy (Looney Tunes) films
Films set in a fictional country
Looney Tunes shorts
Works about censorship